Strickland Roger is a civil parish in South Lakeland, Cumbria, England. In the 2001 census the parish had a population of 544, decreasing at the 2011 census to 480. It lies north of Burneside and west of the A6 road, and is bordered by the parishes of Strickland Ketel to the south west, Nether Staveley and Kentmere to the west, Whitwell and Selside to the north, and Skelsmergh to the east.

There are 16 listed buildings or structures in the parish, all at grade II.

See also

Listed buildings in Strickland Roger

References

Further reading

External links

 Cumbria County History Trust: Burneside (nb: provisional research only – see Talk page)

Civil parishes in Cumbria
South Lakeland District